The 2009 Norwich North by-election was a by-election for the United Kingdom Parliament's House of Commons constituency of Norwich North. The by-election took place due to the resignation of Ian Gibson after being banned from standing as a Labour candidate for the next general election. The writ of election was moved on 30 June 2009 and the by-election took place on 23 July 2009, two days after the start of the summer recess. Unusually for a UK by-election, the counting process was not started until the following day, for a variety of reasons including the high number of postal votes.

The winner of the by-election was Chloe Smith of the Conservative Party, who at 27 became the youngest member of the House of Commons, known as the Baby of the House.

Boundaries
As boundary changes did not come into effect until the 2010 general election, Norwich North was fought on those boundaries in place at the 2005 general election.

The constituency includes parts of two local government areas, Norwich and Broadland, with the majority of the electorate in Broadland.  Nine wards of Broadland (Mile Cross, Crome, Thorpe St Andrew, Sprowston, Old Catton, Catton Grove, Hellesdon, Drayton and Taverham) fall within its boundaries, together with four wards of the City of Norwich (Catton Grove, Crome, Mile Cross, Sewell).

In boundary changes in place for the 2010 general election, Norwich North lost Taverham North, Taverham South, Drayton North and Drayton South to the new Broadland constituency.

Candidates
The Labour Party selected Chris Ostrowski, a University of East Anglia graduate, as their candidate on 28 June.

The Conservative Party had already selected Chloe Smith as their candidate for the general election.

The Liberal Democrats selected April Pond, a local businesswoman and former Norwich City Councillor, who was a candidate for South West Norfolk in 2005.

The Green Party's candidate at the last general election, Adrian Holmes, announced that he would not be standing, and Norwich City Councillor Rupert Read, the Green Party's lead candidate for the East of England in the European elections, was selected on 24 June.  In the European elections the Green Party polled 24.9% across Norwich, more than any other party, while they took 9.6% of the vote in Broadland.

Glenn Tingle stood for the UK Independence Party.

Other minor parties included Robert West for the British National Party, who stood as first candidate for the East Midlands Region in the 2009 European Elections, and the Official Monster Raving Loony Party's leader, Howling Laud Hope.

Three new parties stood candidates for the first time. The Libertarian Party selected 18-year-old Thomas Burridge as their first parliamentary candidate. NOTA, which stands for "None of the Above", a party set up by former boxer Terry Marsh, announced that Anne Fryatt would stand as their candidate. Former ambassador Craig Murray stood as an anti-sleaze candidate for the Put an Honest Man into Parliament party, which was registered with the Electoral Commission on 3 July 2009.

There were also two independent candidates: Bill Holden, who was a candidate in 2005, and Peter Baggs.

Ian Gibson announced that he would not be running as an independent candidate. On 26 June he hinted to Newsnight'''s Michael Crick that he might run as an independent, but he endorsed the Labour candidate three days later.

Broadland District Council published the Statement of Persons Nominated and Notice of Poll'', which lists candidates' names, addresses, official descriptions, and names of nominators, on 8 July 2009.

Results
Both the UK Independence Party and the Green Party of England and Wales achieved their best results to date in a Parliamentary by-election; UKIP had previously taken a 10.2% share in the 2004 by-election in Hartlepool, and the Greens took 7.4% in the 2008 Haltemprice and Howden by-election.

2005 result

References

2009 elections in the United Kingdom
By-elections to the Parliament of the United Kingdom in Norfolk constituencies
2009 in England
July 2009 events in the United Kingdom
Elections in Norwich
2000s in Norfolk